Bretaye (or Col de Bretaye) is a high mountain pass of the Swiss Alps, located above Villars-sur-Ollon in the canton of Vaud. The pass (1,806 m) is connected to Villars by the Bex–Villars–Bretaye railway, which is the second highest railway of the canton after the Montreux–Glion–Rochers-de-Naye railway line. In winter, Bretaye is the main ski area of Villars and a chairlift leads to the summit of Le Chamossaire (2,112 m).

References
Swisstopo topographic maps

External links
Bretaye on Hikr

Ski areas and resorts in Switzerland
Mountain passes of Switzerland
Rail mountain passes of Switzerland